Zona pellucida sperm-binding protein 3, also known as zona pellucida glycoprotein 3 (Zp-3) or the sperm receptor, is a ZP module-containing protein that in humans is encoded by the ZP3 gene. ZP3 is the glycoprotein in the zona pellucida most important for inducting the acrosome reaction of sperm cells at the beginning of fertilization.

Function 

The zona pellucida (ZP) is a specialized extracellular matrix that surrounds the oocyte and early embryo. It is composed of three or four glycoproteins (ZP1-4) with various functions during oogenesis, fertilization and preimplantation development. The protein encoded by this gene is a major structural component of the ZP and functions in primary binding and stimulation of the sperm acrosome reaction. The nascent protein contains a N-terminal signal peptide sequence, a conserved "ZP domain" module, a consensus furin cleavage site (CFCS), a polymerization-blocking external hydrophobic patch (EHP), and a C-terminal transmembrane domain. Cleavage at the CFCS separates the mature protein from the EHP, allowing it to incorporate into nascent ZP filaments. A variation in the last exon of this gene has previously served as the basis for an additional ZP3 locus; however, sequence and literature review reveals that there is only one full-length ZP3 locus in the human genome. Another locus encoding a bipartite transcript designated POMZP3 contains a duplication of the last four exons of ZP3, including the above described variation, and maps closely to this gene.

Orthologs of these genes are found throughout Vertebrata. The western clawed frog appears to have two orthologs, and the sea lamprey has seven.

3D Structure 

X-ray crystallographic studies of the N-terminal half of mammalian ZP3 as well as its full-length avian homolog revealed that the protein's ZP module consists of two immunoglobulin-like domains, ZP-N and ZP-C. The latter, which contains EHP as well as a ZP3-specific subdomain, interacts with the ZP-N domain of a second molecule to generate an antiparallel homodimeric arrangement required for protein secretion.

References

Further reading

External links